Dunayevsky is a rural locality (a settlement) and the administrative center of Dronovskoye Rural Settlement, Karachevsky District, Bryansk Oblast, Russia. The population was 494 as of 2010. There are 8 streets.

Geography 
Dunayevsky is located 22 km southeast of Karachev (the district's administrative centre) by road. Amozovsky is the nearest rural locality.

References 

Rural localities in Karachevsky District